Murray Edward Gordon Finch-Hatton, 12th Earl of Winchilsea and 7th Earl of Nottingham (28 March 1851 – 7 September 1898), styled the Hon. Murray Finch-Hatton until 1887, was a British Conservative politician and agriculturalist. His country residence was at Haverholme Priory, Lincolnshire.

Early life
Winchilsea and Nottingham was the second son of George Finch-Hatton, 10th Earl of Winchilsea and 5th Earl of Nottingham and eldest son by his third wife Fanny Margaretta, daughter of Edward Royd Rice. The tenth earl was famous for his 1829 duel with the Duke of Wellington.

Career

Politician
He unsuccessfully contested Newark in 1880 but entered Parliament for Lincolnshire South in an 1884 by-election, a seat he held until the following year when the constituency was abolished. He then represented Spalding from 1885 until 1887 when he succeeded his half-brother in the two earldoms and entered the House of Lords. His succession led to a network of legal difficulties engaging at different times, it is stated, no fewer than 22 different firms of lawyers.  In 1884 Finch-Hatton, with 135 other members of Parliament, voted that a clause of the Representation of the People Act 1884 enfranchising women be read a second time.

Agriculturalist

He was particularly interested in agricultural questions, where he sought to improve the conditions of agricultural workers.

Obliged by the agricultural depression to dispose of his family seat at Eastwell Park, Kent he became the recognised head of the movement which followed on the Agricultural Congress of 1892 and led in 1894 to the formation of The National Agricultural Union. It aimed at a thorough organisation of the agricultural interests represented alike by the landlords, tenants and labourers. Its programme included:
 reduction of local taxation of agricultural property
 abolition of preferential railway rates for British produce
 old-age pensions for working men
 amendment of the law relating to adulteration of food and the Merchandise Marks Acts
 amendment of the Agricultural Holdings Act
 increased facilities to enable working men to obtain small holdings

By the time of his death in 1898, most of these aims were achieved, including the reduction in railway charges by bulking shipments. To that end, he established early in 1896 British Produce Supply Association Limited with a capital of £50,000 which opened extensive stores for the sale and distribution of British produce under the Cable brand. Cable was the title of the weekly newspaper, the official organ of the National Agricultural Union. County associations of agriculturists were formed for mutual support and combination.

The National Farmers Union (at that time Lincolnshire Farmers Union) was formed in his home county of Lincolnshire in 1904, six years after his death.

Children's Order of Chivalry
In 1893 with his wife, the Countess, he founded the Children's Order of Chivalry in memory of their only son, George Edward Henry, Viscount Maidstone ("Maidy"), who had died the previous year at the age of nine. Prior to his death, the child had discussed with his father the idea of establishing the Order.

Personal life
In 1875, Lord Winchilsea and Nottingham married Edith Harcourt, daughter of Edward William Harcourt. Together they had two children:
 George Edward Henry Finch-Hatton, Viscount Maidstone, (1883-1892), who died at the age of nine
 Lady Muriel Finch-Hatton (1876-1938), who married Sir Richard Arthur Surtees Paget, 2nd Baronet (1869-1955) and left issue, including their grandsons Alexander Chancellor, the father of model Cecilia Chancellor, and John Paget Chancellor, who married the Hon. Mary Alice Jolliffe (daughter of William Jolliffe, 4th Baron Hylton), the parents of actress Anna Chancellor.

Finch-Hatton's country residence was at Haverholme Priory, Lincolnshire and he died in September 1898, aged 47. He was succeeded in his titles by his younger brother, the Hon. Henry Finch-Hatton. The Countess of Winchilsea and Nottingham died in January 1944.

Outdoor recreations
Among Lord Winchilsea's outdoor recreations were bricklaying, glazing and the digging of dykes "in which accomplishment it is said he was not surpassed by any workman in the county". In the summer of 1895, he spent nearly all his holidays repairing the roof of Ewerby church.

Motorist
He was also a great motoring enthusiast, and played a leading role at the very first London to Brighton Car Run on 14 November 1896, symbolically tearing a red flag in two to start the event, and presiding at the dinner which took place in Brighton at its conclusion.

References

Sources
Kidd, Charles, Williamson, David (editors). Debrett's Peerage and Baronetage (1990 edition). New York: St Martin's Press, 1990,

External links 
 

1851 births
1898 deaths
Conservative Party (UK) MPs for English constituencies
UK MPs 1880–1885
UK MPs 1885–1886
UK MPs 1886–1892
UK MPs who inherited peerages
12
707
Murray